The discography of Japanese singer Ami Suzuki from 1998 to present.

Albums

Studio albums

EPs

Compilation albums

Singles

Footnotes:
 ^ = Still active in charts
 ^^ = No Rank
 — = N/A

Promotional singles

Other appearances

Videography

Video albums

Music videos

Others
Bazooka 17 (Box Set released by Sony Music with all Ami's old releases), September 7, 2005
A-Nation '05 Best Hit Live (including "Delightful"), October 26, 2005
A-Nation '06 Best Hit Live (including "Alright!"), November 8, 2006
A-Nation '07 Best Hit Live (including "Delightful"), November 7, 2007
A-Nation '08 -Avex All Cast Special Live- (including "One"), November 26, 2008
A-Nation '09 Best Hit Live (including "Delightful"), November 18, 2009
A-Nation '10 Best Hit Live (including "Delightful"), November 24, 2010

References

Discographies of Japanese artists
Pop music discographies